Harold Crooms (born October 24, 1979) is an American professional stock car racing driver. He competes in the CARS Super Late Model Tour and short track racing divisions, and has also raced in the NASCAR Xfinity Series.

Racing career
Crooms primarily races in the CARS Super Late Model Tour and short tracks in his home state of Florida.

In 2020, he tested an ARCA Menards Series car for MBM Motorsports at Daytona International Speedway; he was the 18th fastest of 38 participants on the first day of testing, followed by ranking 18th of 39 on the second. He made his NASCAR Xfinity Series debut for the team on the Daytona road course in August, where he finished 35th after a brake failure.

Motorsports career results

NASCAR
(key) (Bold – Pole position awarded by qualifying time. Italics – Pole position earned by points standings or practice time. * – Most laps led.)

Xfinity Series

References

External links
 

1979 births
Living people
NASCAR drivers
Sportspeople from Lakeland, Florida
Racing drivers from Florida